Andre Talbot (born May 3, 1978) is a former professional wide receiver and slotback who played gridiron football in the Canadian Football League. Talbot played his first nine seasons in the CFL with the Toronto Argonauts and his tenth season with the Edmonton Eskimos.

Football career
Talbot played high school football at Monsignor Paul Dwyer Catholic High School in Oshawa. He later played university football at Wilfrid Laurier University where he was a two time All-Canadian and was drafted by the Toronto Argonauts in 2001. On February 10, 2010, Talbot was traded from the Argonauts to the Eskimos along with receiver Brad Smith in exchange for defensive tackle Eric Taylor.

On March 31, 2011, Talbot announced his retirement from the CFL.

Personal life
Talbot was born in Toronto, Ontario.  When he was five years old, his family moved to Woodstock, Ontario.  Seven years later, Talbot's family moved to Oshawa, Ontario. Talbot also performs as a lead singer for a rock band called "The Street Fever".

After his retirement from football, Talbot became a yoga instructor and is currently a co-owner of a yoga studio in Toronto called "Spirit Loft".

References

External links
 ProFootballArchives stats page
 Official Website
 

1978 births
Living people
Canadian football wide receivers
Edmonton Elks players
Franco-Ontarian people
Sportspeople from Oshawa
Canadian football people from Toronto
People from Woodstock, Ontario
Players of Canadian football from Ontario
Toronto Argonauts players
Wilfrid Laurier Golden Hawks football players